The term “duplex” is used in Australia for soils with contrasting texture between soil horizons, although such soils are found in other parts of the world.  Duplex soils are also termed “texture contrast soils”.  

With the term “duplex soil”, Northcote  defined a primary profile in his Factual Key classification. He described a group of texture contrast soils where the B horizon is dominated by a texture class one and a half (or more) finer than the A horizon. In addition, the clear to sharp change between the two  horizons must  occur within 0.1 m. 

Texture in duplex soils is highly variable, with the top-soils ranging from coarse sand to clay loam and the subsoils from light to heavy clay. Some duplex soils are distinguished by the presence of an A2 bleached horizon, a character also used as a diagnostic key for the distinction between these type of soils.

The diagnostic properties used by Northcote for the definition of duplex soils consider only the soil texture (texture contrast and type of boundary between horizons A and B) and the colour is used for their differentiation (i.e. brown, red and yellow duplex soils). Under the Australian Soil Classification   they can be included in different orders such as Podosols, Sodosol, Chromosols or Kurosols.

References

Soil science
Types of soil